Kadapa district (officially: YSR district; formerly: Cuddapah district) is one of the twenty six districts in the Indian state of Andhra Pradesh. On 19 August 2005 nomenclature of “Cuddapah” has been changed as “Kadapa” by the Government of A.P. It was renamed as Y.S.R District during the year 2010, in honour of Y. S. Rajasekhara Reddy, commemorating the former chief minister of united Andhra Pradesh. It is also one of the eight districts in the Rayalaseema region. Kadapa is the administrative headquarters for this district.

History

Rock paintings 
Paleolithic rock paintings found at Chintakunta caves near Muddanur in Kadapa district are said to be the second largest group of paintings in India after Bhimbetika rock art paintings. The rock paintings with mystic figures are also found at Dappalle village near Mylavaram Dam in Jammalamadugu Taluk of the district.

Prehistoric culture 
Many Paleolithic sites were found in Kadapa district, as the surroundings of Jammalamadugu, Mailavaram Dam and Gandikota.

Some megalithic burial sites were explored near Porumamilla, Sankhavaram and at Yellatur village near Kadapa. The surroundings of Vontimitta are also noted as Megalithic cultural sites.

The section of Rayachoti consists of many documented and undocumented Megalithic sites and stone circles. A noted megalithic site is at Devandlapalli in Tsundupalle taluk of the district.

Buddhism and Jainism 
Kadapa has historical importance since the BC era. It was ruled by the Mauryan Empire and the Satavahana Empire (Andhras). Buddhism flourished for many years along the banks of the rivers Cheyyeru and Penna. Nandalur is an important Buddhist site in the district along with Tallapaka, Rajampeta, Konduru, Khazipeta in the district. Jainism also had a place in Kadapa district history; the remnants of a buried Jain temple were found at Danavulapadu village on the banks of the Penna.

Medieval history 
The district is part of Rayalaseema, commemorating the name of Rayulu (Kings) of the Vijayanagar Empire, who ruled the area in the 16th century. Gandikota fort located on the bank of the Penna river was the citadel of Pemmasani Nayaks, commanders of Vijayanagar army and who won the battles of Raichur and Gulbarga for the Vijayanagar kings.

The old records of the district reveal that Kadapa previously called Gadapa which translated in Telugu to threshold. The ancient village of Kadapa with its large tank and temple of Lord Venkateswara at Devuni Kadapa was convenient camping place for the myriads of pilgrims travelling to the holy shrine of Tirupathi. There was a belief that the pilgrims have to first visit Devuni Kadapa, before going to Tirupathi to pray to Saint Annamacharya and Saint Potuluri Veera Brahmam who foretold the future and advocated a classless society. The ancient temple at Vontimitta which inspired Pothana to compose Andhra Maha Bhagavatham is also in the district. In the olden days Kadapa was also called "Hiranyanagaram".

Recent historical records reveal that Jyothi village located in Siddavatam mandal has 108 Shiva lingas on the bank of the river.

Nawabs of Kadapa

Modern history 
After the Treaty of Seringapatam, the Nizam of Hyderabad acquired the district. He ceded it to the British in 1800, and in 1808 it was divided to form Kadapa (spelt Cuddapah by the British) and Bellary districts.

The district headquarters were situated in Siddavatam but moved to Kadapa in 1812.

Geography 
The main rivers in this district are Penna, Kundu,Chitravathi, Kunderu, Papagni, Sagileru, Bahuda and Cheyyeru.

This district is surrounded by North of Nandyal district,South of Annamayya district ,East of SPSR Nellore district ,west of Sri Sathya Sai district,Anantapur district.This district is located in center of Andhra Pradesh.

Reservoirs 
Kadapa district has several reservoirs, some of which are Brahmamsagar Reservoir, Mylavaram Dam Reservoir, Annamayya Project, Gandikota Reservoir.

Demographics 

 census, Kadapa district has a population of 2,884,524. This gives it a ranking of 132nd in India (out of a total of 640). Its population growth rate over the decade 2001–2011 was 10.87%. It has a sex ratio of 984 females for every 1000 males, and a literacy rate of 67.88%.

After reorganization the district had a population of 20,60,654, of which 809,290 (39.27%) lived in urban areas. Kadapa district had a sex ratio of 985 females per 1000 males. Scheduled Castes and Scheduled Tribes make up 3,37,860 (16.40%) and 40,994 (1.99%) of the population respectively.

At the time of the 2011 census, 84.66% of the population spoke Telugu and 14.37% Urdu as their first language.

Economy 

Besides its historical importance, the district has occupied an important place in the industrial map of Andhra Pradesh with its valuable mineral resources.

The primary, secondary and tertiary sectors of the district contribute ,  and  respectively.

Black corson soil lands are 24%, black soil 19%, sandy soil lands 4%, red soil lands 25%. The first variety lands are very fertile, sand soil lands less so. 'Korra', orange, lime and betel leaf are the special crops. They are cultivated near river beds. The main source of drinking water to this district is Galeru Nagari Sujala Sravanthi Project Canal.

This district is the repository of mineral wealth. As per the 1983 survey of geological survey of India 3 million tons of lead, 74,000,000 tons of barytes, and 27000 tons of asbestos deposits are there. It is estimated that 70 million tons of barytes deposits might be in Mangampet. There are clay deposits in Rajampet. This is used to make stone implements. Limestone is available in Yerraguntla. National Mineral Development Corporation is extracting asbestos in Brahman palli and barytes in Mangampet. Kadapa is also famous for its stone called "kadapa stone" used in building construction and for slabs especially in south India. In Tummalapalle, there are 49,000 tonnes of confirmed uranium deposits which are mined and processed locally. Apart from these minerals and industries Agriculture also forms a part district economy.

Industries 
In 2006 the Indian government named Kadapa district as one of the country's 250 most backward districts (out of a total of 640). It is one of the thirteen districts in Andhra Pradesh currently receiving funds from the Backward Regions Grant Fund Programme (BRGF).

Administrative divisions

Divisions 
Kadapa district has four Revenue Divisions viz. Kadapa, Badvel, Pulivendula and Jammalamadugu divisions. The district has 36 mandals under these revenue divisions. It also has a Municipal Corporation of Kadapa and six municipalities namely Badvel, Mydukur, Proddatur, Pulivendula, Yerraguntla,Jammalamadugu.

Mandals 
The mandals are listed with respect to their revenue divisions in the following table:

Before the formation of mandals, Administration was done through Taluka system. Erstwhile Talukas in Kadapa district were:

Parliament constituenciy 
Kadapa (Lok Sabha constituency)

Assembly constituencies

Cities & Towns 

The population of towns in Kadapa district is as follows:

Transport 

Kadapa district is well-connected by road, rail and airways with neighbouring districts of Andhra Pradesh.

Roadways 
National Highway 40, National Highway 716 and National Highway 67 pass through the district.

Railways 
The district has railway administration under Guntakal railway division. Kadapa, Yerraguntla Junction, Proddatur, Jammalamadugu are some of the main railway stations in the district.

Airways 
Kadapa Airport is located north west to Kadapa city. And the railway line starts from the west town kondapuram.

Education 

The primary and secondary school education is imparted by government, aided and private schools, under the School Education Department of the state.  the school information report for the academic year 2015–16, there are a total of 4,488 schools. They include, 22 government, 3,094 mandal and zilla parishads, 1 residential, 1,181 private, 10 model, 29 Kasturba Gandhi Balika Vidyalaya (KGBV), 88 municipal and 63 other types of schools. The total number of students enrolled in primary, upper primary and high schools of the district are 416,782.

There are junior colleges for (10+2) education, among which 25 are under government, 13 are social welfare, 26 private aided, 83 are private unaided and also there are a few incentive, co-operative, government model colleges. For the purpose of imparting and the students sit for the certificate of Board of Intermediate Education. The government colleges of Kadapa, Proddatur, Pulivendula, Rayachoti, Jammalamadugu, and Rajampet are the oldest government colleges of the district, established in 1969.

The higher education colleges have various fields of study like medical, nursing, degree, post graduate, polytechnic, law, teaching, pharmacy, engineering, veterinary, etc. The Yogi Vemana University is a state university which has one autonomous college as per the Universities Grant Commission. Sri Venkateswara College of Veterinary Sciences. The engineering colleges of the district are, KSRM College of Engineering, Annamacharya Institute of Technology and Sciences, etc.

 Rajiv Gandhi Institute of Medical Sciences, Kadapa
 KSRM College of Engineering
 Yogi Vemana University
 Sri Venkateswara Veterinary College
 YSR Engineering College of YVU, Proddatur
 JNTUA College of Engineering, Pulivendula

Notable people 

 Annamacharya, Hindu saint and musician
 Charles Philip Brown, Telugu author, district Collector
 P. Kannamba, actress and producer
 P. Jaya Kumar, filmmaker, screenwriter
 Atukuri Molla, poet
 Neelakanta (director), director
 B. Padmanabham, actor, comedian and producer
 Allasani Peddana, one of the poets in Astdiggajalu in Srikrishnadevarayalu
 B. N. Reddy, film director
 B. Nagi Reddy, film producer
 K. Jayachandra Reddy, Justice and former Supreme Court Judge
 V. N. Reddy, cinematographer
 Y. S. Rajasekhara Reddy, former chief minister of combined Andhra Pradesh
 Janamanchi Seshadri Sarma, poet
 Santha Kumari, musical artist and film actress
 Vavilikolanu Subbarao, poet
 Vemana, philosopher and poet
 Potuluri Veerabrahmam, saint and astrologer
 Y. Vijaya, character artist in Telugu and Tamil films

References

External links 

 

 
Districts of Andhra Pradesh
Rayalaseema
1808 establishments in British India